Néstor Adrián de Vicente (16 June 1964 – 20 March 2011) was an Argentine professional footballer who played as a midfielder.

Career
De Vicente played in Argentina for River Plate, Instituto, Talleres, Platense, Estudiantes and Racing Club, and in Switzerland for Grasshopper.

Later life and death
De Vicente died on 20 March 2011, in a car crash, at the age of 46.

References

1964 births
2011 deaths
Argentine footballers
Road incident deaths in Argentina
Association football midfielders
Racing Club de Avellaneda footballers
Estudiantes de La Plata footballers
Sportspeople from Buenos Aires Province